Alberta Provincial Highway No. 72 is a  highway in central Alberta, Canada, connecting the Queen Elizabeth II Highway near Crossfield to Highway 9 in Beiseker.

At its west end, Highway 72 begins at its intersection with Highways 2 and 2A at Exit 295 southeast of the Town of Crossfield and ends at Highways 9 and 806 at the Village of Beiseker. The entire stretch of Highway 72 is in Rocky View County.

Major intersections

References 

072